is a Japanese voice actress who is affiliated with Raccoon Dog (formerly with Pro-Fit). She played her major first voice role as Yui Nagomi/Cure Precious, the protagonist of the 2022 Magical Girl anime series Delicious Party Pretty Cure.

Biography
Hana Hishikawa was born on 19 May 2003 in Tokyo.

After she finished her training in 2020, Hishikawa became affiliated with the voice acting agency Pro-Fit while in high school. As a result of Pro-Fit's closure, she was transferred to Raccoon Dog on 1 April 2022.

In 2022, she was selected as the main character of "Delicious Party Pretty Cure", Yui Nagomi/Cure Precious.

Filmography

TV anime
2020
Moriarty the Patriot as Girl

2021
Aikatsu Planet! as Child
Farewell, My Dear Cramer as Kunogi No. 2
SSSS.DYNAZENON as Weather forecaster
The Saint's Magic Power is Omnipotent as Handmaiden, Maid
Joran: The Princess of Snow and Blood as multiple characters
The Aquatope on White Sand as Customers
Blue Period as Woman

2022
Delicious Party Pretty Cure as Yui Nagomi/Cure Precious

Animated films
 Pompo: The Cinéphile (2021) 
 Shōjo Kageki Revue Starlight (2021)

OVAs/ONAs
 Given: Uragawa no Sonzai (2019) as Schoolgirl

Video games
2019
Touhou Danmaku Kagura as Aki Sizuha
2021
Demon Slayer: Kimetsu no Yaiba – The Hinokami Chronicles

Other
A Couple of Cuckoos  100 People 100 Voices Project (2021)

Notes

References

External links 
 Official agency profile 
 

2003 births
Living people
Japanese people of Chinese descent
Japanese video game actresses
Japanese voice actresses
Japanese actresses
Voice actresses from Tokyo
21st-century Japanese actresses